Lava Bear Films is a production and film financing company producing three to five projects annually that are specifically designed for the global marketplace. The company was founded in 2011 by David Linde who served as CEO until October, 2015 when Participant Media announced that Linde joined the company as its CEO. Lava Bear’s development slate of over fifteen titles and upcoming productions will continue to be overseen by Tory Metzger, President and Partner of Lava Bear, with Linde’s support during his transition.

The company's creative partners include David S. Goyer, David Michôd, Guillermo del Toro, Shawn Levy, Denis Villeneuve, Zhang Yimou, and Alfonso and Jonás Cuarón, among many others.

With Reliance Entertainment as its primary equity investor, Lava Bear also maintains a network of direct output partnerships in several key territories around the globe with the following companies serving to complete its worldwide distribution and financing platform:

 Entertainment One (eOne) (Canada, the UK and Benelux; Belgium, Netherlands, and Luxembourg)
 Italia Films (Middle East, Greece and Turkey)
 Nordisk Film (Nordic Countries: Denmark, Sweden, Norway, Finland and Iceland)
 Revolutionary Releasing (Eastern Europe, excluding Russia)
 Sun Distribution (Latin America)
 Tele München Group (later Leonine Holding) (Germany and Austria, with certain rights in Switzerland, Luxembourg and Liechtenstein)
 Reliance Entertainment (India)

Films in development & production
In November 2013, Jason Zada was signed by Lava Bear and David S. Goyer to helm the Goyer-produced film The Forest starring Natalie Dormer and Michael Huisman. Focus Features picked up the North American distribution rights to the film, which acts as Zada's feature film directorial debut and was released on January 8, 2016. Lava Bear is also produced Shut In with EuropaCorp distributing worldwide and starring Naomi Watts; and on director Sammo Hung’s The Bodyguard starring Sammo Hung and Chinese superstar Andy Lau. Lava Bear is also a producer, with 21 Laps and FilmNation, on Denis Villeneuve's Arrival, starring Amy Adams, Jeremy Renner and Forest Whitaker and distributed domestically by Paramount Pictures. The company, with Esperanto Kino and Itaca Films, premiered Jonás Cuarón’s Desierto as a Special Presentation at the 2016 Toronto International Film Festival.

References

External links

Film production companies of the United States
Entertainment companies based in California
Companies based in Los Angeles
Entertainment companies established in 2011
2011 establishments in California